The black-capped screech owl (Megascops atricapilla), or variable screech owl, is a species of owl in the family Strigidae. It is found in Argentina, Brazil, and Paraguay.

Taxonomy and systematics

The black-capped screech owl is monotypic. It is part of a complex of species that includes the Santa Marta screech owl (M. gilesi), West Peruvian screech owl (M. roboratus), tawny-bellied screech owl (M. watsonii), and perhaps other undescribed species.

Description

It occurs in brown, rufous, and gray morphs. All have a light facial disc with a distinct dark border, a blackish crown, and prominent "ear" tufts. Their eye color ranges from dark brown to amber. The brown morph's upperparts are dark brown with pale mottling and vermiculation. The folded wing shows a line of pale spots. The underparts are paler with irregular markings. The other two morphs are redder and grayer respectively.

Distribution and habitat

The black-capped screech owl is found in southeastern Brazil, southeastern Paraguay, and extreme northeastern Argentina. It inhabits a variety of landscapes, especially lowland rainforest and including forest with thick undergrowth, edges, open woodland, and secondary forest. In the northern part of its range it is found from sea level to at least  but in the south only to

Behavior

Feeding

The black-capped screech owl usually hunts in the forest canopy, scanning for prey from a perch, but it also frequently hunts in undergrowth. Its diet is primarily insects and also probably includes small vertebrates.

Breeding

The black-capped screech owl's breeding season appears to include October and November, but has not been fully defined. It nests in tree cavities, both natural and made by woodpeckers. It might be semi-colonial, as it has been recorded nesting close to others of its species.

Vocalization

The black-capped screech owl's primary song is "a long fast trill, very faint before increasing in volume, [and] ending abruptly". Its secondary song is short, with a "bouncing-ball rhythm". Both sexes sing in duet and the female's voice is higher pitched.

Status

The IUCN has assessed the black-capped screech owl as being of Least Concern. Its population number and trend are unknown. It "seems to require fairly large areas of forest in some areas, and it may not be able to survive in remnant forest reserves."

References

External links
Megascops atricapillus at owlpages.com

black-capped screech owl
Birds of the Cerrado
Birds of the Atlantic Forest
black-capped screech owl
Taxonomy articles created by Polbot